The women's 100 metres hurdles at the 2013 World Championships in Athletics was held at the Luzhniki Stadium on 12–15 August.

In the heats and semis it was the same two names, now lined up next to each other.  Brianna Rollins has set the event on fire all season long, winning the NCAA Championships in the fastest time in the last 20 years and Sally Pearson the defending champion and Olympic champion, who had that same honor before Rollins.  In the final it was Pearson out first, but Rollins did what she has done all year, run faster than everybody else.  Pearson equalled her season best from the semis in second, Tiffany Porter put in a personal best 12.55 to push Dawn Harper off the medal stand only the second time at a major since the 2008 Olympics.

Records
Prior to the competition, the records were as follows:

Qualification standards

Schedule

Results

Heats
Qualification: First 4 in each heat (Q) and the next 4 fastest (q) advanced to the semifinals.

Wind: Heat 1: −0.5 m/s, Heat 2: −0.5 m/s, Heat 3: −0.5 m/s, Heat 4: −0.4 m/s, Heat 5: −0.8 m/s.

Semifinals
Qualification: First 2 in each heat (Q) and the next 2 fastest (q) advanced to the final.

Wind: Heat 1: −0.6 m/s, Heat 2: +0.2 m/s , Heat 3: -0.7 m/s.

Final
The final was started at 19:50.

Wind: −0.6 m/s.

References

External links
100 metres hurdles results at IAAF website

100 metres hurdles
Sprint hurdles at the World Athletics Championships
2013 in women's athletics